Pultenaea trichophylla, commonly known as tufted bush-pea,<ref name="efloraSA">{{cite web |title=Pultenaea trichophylla'''' |url=http://www.flora.sa.gov.au/cgi-bin/speciesfacts_display.cgi?form=speciesfacts&name=Pultenaea_trichophylla |publisher=State Herbarium of South Australia |access-date=12 September 2021}}</ref> is a species of flowering plant in the family Fabaceae and is endemic to South Australia. It is a slender, prostrate to erect shrub with hairy branchlets, lance-shaped leaves, and yellow to orange and red, pea-like flowers.

TaxonomyPultenaea trichophylla was first formally described in 1924 by John McConnell Black in the Flora of South Australia from an unpublished description by Herbert Bennett Williamson, the type specimens collected near Port Lincoln. In 1925, H.B. Williamson published a description of Pultenaea trichophylla from the same collection, in Proceedings of the Royal Society of Victoria, but the Williamson's name is illegitimate because it had already been published by Black. The specific epithet (trichophylla'') means "hair-like-leaved".

Distribution and habitat
This species of pultenaea grows in open woodland or mallee on the southern Eyre Peninsula.

References

Fabales of Australia
Flora of South Australia
trichophylla
Plants described in 1924
Taxa named by John McConnell Black